Elections were held in the organized municipalities in the Manitoulin District of Ontario on October 25, 2010 in conjunction with municipal elections across the province.

Assiginack
Clyde "Bud" Rohn was elected reeve of Assiginack. Robert Case, Brad Ham, Paul Moffatt and Brenda Reid were elected to council.

Billings
Incumbent reeve Austin Hunt was re-elected in Billings. Kim Bilbija, Sandi Hurcomb, Brian Parker and Tom Imrie were elected to council.

Burpee and Mills
Incumbent reeve Ken Noland was acclaimed back into office in Burpee and Mills.

Central Manitoulin
Gerry Strong defeated incumbent reeve Richard Stephens in Central Manitoulin. Adam Smith, Adam McDonald, Gloria Haner, Patricia MacDonald, Derek Stephens and  Beverly Pearson-Trainor were elected to council.

Cockburn Island
Incumbent reeve David Haight was acclaimed back into office in Cockburn Island.

Gordon/Barrie Island
No council elections were held in Gordon/Barrie Island, as the entire council won by acclamation. Jack Brady succeeded retiring reeve Art Madore, while council will consist of Betty Noble, Lee Hayden, Barbara Barfoot and Bob Glasgow.

Gore Bay
Ron Lane defeated incumbent mayor Joyce Foster in Gore Bay. Wes Bentley, Yvonne Bailey, Lou Addison, Betsy Clark, Harry Vanderweerden and Jack Clark were elected to council.

Northeastern Manitoulin and the Islands
Joe Chapman, a former mayor of Northeastern Manitoulin and the Islands who was defeated by Jim Stringer in 2006, defeated Stringer to reclaim the mayor's chair. Christina Jones, Bill Koehler, Al MacNevin, Marcel Gauthier, Dawn Orr, Paul Skippen and Bruce Wood were elected or acclaimed to council.

Tehkummah
Incumbent reeve Gary Brown was acclaimed back into office in Tehkummah. Eric Russell, Lorie Leeson, Paul Bowerman and Arend Van Vierzen were elected to council.

References

2010 Ontario municipal elections
Manitoulin District